Cumanotus fernaldi is a species of sea slug, an aeolid nudibranch, a marine gastropod mollusc in the family Cumanotidae.

Distribution
This species was described from the San Juan Islands, British Columbia, Canada, .

References

Cumanotidae
Gastropods described in 1984